Escape is Kim Hyung-jun's second Korean EP. It was released on July 10, 2012 by S-Plus Entertainment and distributed by Direct Media via Sony Music Korea. The album was also released in Japan and Taiwan.

The album contains five songs including an introduction track and its title track, "Sorry I'm Sorry".

Background and development
After one year and four months since his last mini-album release, My Girl, Kim Hyung-jun tweeted on June 11, 2012, suggesting his music comeback with a tweet: "Okay, shall we slowly get started? Is Everyone ready? ^^ Let's go, go!" accompanied by a photo with the text: "201207 KIM HYUNG JUN MINI ALBUM <ESCAPE>/20120629 MINI CONCERT & SHOWCASE", representing the release dates of his then-upcoming album and mini concert. The next week, Kim released a second photo teaser of his comeback, which shows the same text.

In addition with the photo teasers, Kim also announced his co-label mates Kang Ji-hwan and Lee Ki-woo's participation in his music video making. Directed by Cha Eun Taek, the actors were to star in Kim's 25-minute dramatic music video, presented with his other album tracks. On July 1, Kim released a drama teaser starring Lee Ki-woo, Kang Ji-hwan, and Kim, himself. The 68-second video shows the three of them engaged in violent gang fights and committing crimes for their girlfriends.

On July 4, Kim released a 50-second video teaser for his single "Sorry, I'm Sorry" music video, which will be the introduction in the final music video. The next day, he once again released through his YouTube account a 55-second video teaser, showing the snippets of his lead track, as well as parts of the scenes and dance.

Release and promotion
On June 29, Kim launched a mini-concert at the AX-Korea, Gwangjang-dong, Seoul to showcase his upcoming album. His co-members Heo Young-saeng and Kim Kyu-jong attended his mini-concert and they went up on stage with him during the finale. In addition, Kim held a guerilla event on July 7 and 8 outside on the streets of Insadong, Myundong, Shinchun, and other streets in Seoul to promote his then pre-released album.

On July 9, Kim uploaded his "Sorry, I'm Sorry" music video through his YouTube account. The next day, the full album was released offline. Days later, Kim uploaded a 64-second drama teaser on his YouTube account featuring the story of Kang Ji-hwan's character. He released yet another 33-second drama teaser featuring the stories of Kim and Lee Ki-woo's characters next. Accompanied by the songs "Bad Guy" and "Just Let It Go" respectively, the videos shown are snippets to promote his DVD release on July 13, wherein the full drama was only made available offline through buying the DVD version of the album.

Following the launch of the album in Korea, Kim focused his promotions in Japan, starting on August 3 at Zepp Tokyo. Entitled Kim Hyung Jun 2012 2nd Story in Japan, he toured the cities of Tokyo, Fukuoka, Osaka, Nagoya and Sapporo for the whole month of August. Kim also celebrated his 25th birthday during his Japan tour together with his family and friends, fans, and special guest Jichō Kachō's Komoto Junichi. He also appeared in various radio shows and selected Japanese television programs in between his tour to further promote his album.

Track listing
Both the Korean and Taiwan version of the album include 5 original songs, with a bonus of "Sorry, I'm Sorry" music video and its making (and "Escape" teaser in Taiwan) on the DVD edition. On the other hand, the Japanese version of the album includes a Japanese version of "Sorry, I'm Sorry" and one new Japanese track "Callin'" besides the 5 original songs. The three CD+DVD jacket versions, however, replace the seventh track with songs "A Song Calling For You", "A Kata no Otoko" and "Sweet, Everyday" respectively, as well as including two music and drama videos each.

Korea and Taiwan edition

Japan edition

Music videos
 "Sorry I'm Sorry"

Release history

Charts

Notes

References

External links
 
 "Sorry, I'm Sorry" music video
 Drama teaser

SS501 albums
Warner Music Taiwan EPs
2012 EPs